is a professional football club based in Niigata, Japan. Formed in 1955 as Niigata Eleven SC, it was renamed Albireo Niigata FC in 1995, and Albirex Niigata in 1997. From 2023, Albirex will be playing on the J1 League, coming back to the first division after five seasons.

History

For many years it had been a local autonomous amateur club, Niigata 11, that could never hope to see the light of day in an old Japan Soccer League dominated almost entirely by company teams. The creation of the J. League spurred the club to rise, and in the 1990s it began climbing fast through the divisions.

In 1998, Albirex Niigata joined the Japan Football League, and was merged into the J2 league after its creation in 1999. The team gradually became competitive and in 2001 and 2002 it came close to getting promoted to J1 and in 2003, it became the champion of J2 and finally joined the top flight.

The team name is made from combining the star Albireo of the constellation Cygnus (the Swan) and the Latin word Rex meaning 'king'. In 1997, due to copyright issues, the team name was changed from Albireo Niigata to the current Albirex Niigata.

In 2007, the uniform colour changed. Until 2006, the uniform was orange – blue – orange, but in 2007 the color became orange – orange – orange. This coordinate has not been adopted since 1996 when the team professionalized.

The success of Albirex Niigata had a big impact on the entire Japanese sporting world, including professional baseball. It showed people were more excited than expected for sports in local cities without the population of the metropolitan area in the past, and local citizens feelings influenced many other sports in the region.

Team name transition
Niigata Eleven SC (Soccer Club) (1955)
Albireo Niigata FC (1995)
Albirex Niigata (1997)

Stadium

Joining the J. League in 1999, its home towns are Niigata and Seiro. Until 2003, it used Niigata Perfectural Sport Ground as the home ground but since 2004, the team began using Niigata Stadium Big Swan as well and now plays most of its games there. In 2003, it set a record for highest attendance in the J. League with the cumulative total of around 660,000.

The club plays its home games in the Niigata Stadium "Big Swan", which is currently called Denka Big Swan Stadium through a sponsorship deal. The stadium was opened in 2001, and has a capacity of 42,300. Prior to this the club had played its matches in the Niigata City Athletic Stadium constructed in 1938 with a capacity of 18,000.

The stadium was the site of two first round matches and one Round of 16 match in the past 2002 FIFA World Cup. It was also the venue for the 2009 National Sports Festival.

Record as J.League member

Key

Current squad

Type 2

Type 2

Out on loan

Notable players

Technical staff

Managerial history 
Correct as of 23 October 2022

Honours
 J2 League
 Champions (2): 2003, 2022
 Hokushinetsu Football League
 Champions (3): 1986, 1996, 1997
 Runners-up (1): 1992
 All Japan Senior Football Championship
 Runners-up (1): 1995

Kit evolution

Affiliated clubs

Since 2004, Albirex Niigata has selected a number of players for its satellite team in the Singapore Premier League. Albirex also has a women's team and joined L2 league (an equivalent of J2) in 2004. Albirex Ladies won the L2 title in 2006, and went on to join L1 in 2007.

The following clubs are affiliated with Albirex Niigata:
  Albirex Niigata Ladies (Japan Women's Football League)
  Japan Soccer College (Hokushinetsu Football League)
  Albirex Niigata Singapore FC (Singapore Premier League)

In addition to the J-1 Albirex Niigata football team, there is a Niigata Albirex basketball club in the B.League, as well as a ski, snowboard, baseball, and track and field team. Even though the teams share the same name, the management and finances are completely separate for each team.

References

External links

Official website

 
J.League clubs
Football clubs in Japan
Association football clubs established in 1955
Sports teams in Niigata Prefecture
Multi-sport clubs in Japan
1955 establishments in Japan
Japan Football League (1992–1998) clubs
Articles which contain graphical timelines